No More Songs About Sleep and Fire is the eighth album by American alternative rock band Poster Children, released in 2004.  The version released on enhanced CD-ROM features a layered front cover design, and is enhanced with the video for "Western Springs."  The CD-ROM also features an album-length commentary track.  The vinyl issue includes an exclusive lyric sheet.

Critical reception
The Chicago Tribune called the album "a ferocious, ticked-off expression of energy and commitment renewed."

Track listing
 "Jane" – 2:13
 "Western Springs" – 2:49
 "Sugarfriend" – 2:34
 "Flag" – 2:48
 "Shy" – 2:17
 "The Floor" – 3:33
 "The Leader" – 3:17
 "Now It's Gone" – 3:21
 "Different & Special Things" – 2:51
 "The Bottle" – 4:10
 "Hollywood, Pt. II" – 3:18
 "Midnite Son" – 3:57

Personnel
Rick Valentin – Vocals, Guitar
Rose Marshack – Bass, vocals
Jim Valentin – Guitar
Matt Friscia – Drums

References

Poster Children albums
2004 albums